Adriano Novellini (born September 2, 1948) is an Italian professional football coach and a former player.

Honours
 Serie A champion: 1971/72.
 Coppa Italia winner: 1973/74.

1948 births
Living people
Italian footballers
Serie A players
Atalanta B.C. players
Juventus F.C. players
Bologna F.C. 1909 players
Cagliari Calcio players
Palermo F.C. players
Italian football managers
Association football midfielders